Emilia Monjowa Lifaka (11 April 195920 April 2021) was a Cameroonian politician and chairperson of the Commonwealth Parliamentary Association. She was a member of the National Assembly of Cameroon, first elected in 2002, and was  vice-president of the Assembly at the time of her death.

Early life and education
Monjowa Lifaka had a diploma in secretarial and business studies from Crown Secretarial and Business Studies College in England, and a diploma in administrative management from the University of Maryland Eastern Shore in the United States.  she was studying for an MBA in human resource management with Anglia Ruskin University in England.

Political career
Monjowa Lifaka represented the South West constituency for the  Cameroon People's Democratic Movement (CPDM / RDPC), in the 7th 8th, 9th, and 10th Legislations  of the National Assembly of Cameroon, and was its Vicce-President from 2009 until her death.

In 2017 she became chairperson of the Commonwealth Parliamentary Association.

Recognition
She was awarded three national honours:
 Knight of the Cameroon National Order of Merit 
 Officer of the Cameroon National Order of Merit 
 Knight of the National Order of Valour.

Death
Monjowa Lifaka died on 20 April 2021 at the age of 62, from an COVID-19.

References

1959 births
2021 deaths
21st-century Cameroonian women politicians
21st-century Cameroonian politicians
Members of the National Assembly (Cameroon)
Alumni of Anglia Ruskin University
University of Maryland Eastern Shore alumni
Deaths from the COVID-19 pandemic in Cameroon